Byram–Middleton House is a historic home located at Indianapolis, Indiana.  It was built in 1870, and is a two-story, irregularly massed, Italianate style brick dwelling.  It has a low hipped roof with bracketed eaves and arched openings.  It has been converted to commercial uses.

It was listed on the National Register of Historic Places in 1983.

References

Houses on the National Register of Historic Places in Indiana
Italianate architecture in Indiana
Houses completed in 1870
Houses in Indianapolis
National Register of Historic Places in Indianapolis